Oliver Dene Jones, known as Skream, is an English electronic music producer based in Croydon.

Solo

Albums

Extended plays

 The Judgement (with Benga) (2003)
 Hydro / Elektro (Benga / Skream) (2004)
 The Southside EP 1 (2006)
 The Southside EP 2 (2006)
 Skreamizm, Vol. 1 (2006)
 Skreamizm, Vol. 2 (2006)
 Acid People (2007)
 Skreamizm, Vol. 3 (2007)
 Skreamizm, Vol. 4 (2007)
 Skreamizm, Vol. 5 (2008)
 Skream EP (2011)
 Skreamizm, Vol. 6 (2011)
 Skreamizm, Vol. 7 (2012)

Singles
 "Midnight Request Line" / "I" (2005)
 "28g" / "Fearless" (with Loefah) (2005)
 "Bahl Fwd" / "Temptation" (Skream / Distance) (2006)
 "Tapped" / "Dutch Flowerz" (2006)
 "Travels" / "Wise Men" (with Distance) (2006)
 "Sub Island" / "Pass The Red Stripe" (2007)
 "Retro" / "Wake Up" (with Hijak) (2007)
 "Hedd Banger" / "Percression" (2008)
 "Burning Up" (2009)
 "Just Being Me" / "Murdera" (2009)
 "Repercussions of a Razor Blade" / "A New Dawn" (2010)
 "No Future (Skreamix)" / "Minimalistix" (Instra:mental / Skream) (2010)
 "Listenin' to the Records on My Wall" / "Give You Everything (featuring Freckles)" (2010)
 "Shot Yourself in the Foot Again" (with Example) (2011) – UK: #82, Australia: #75
 "Where You Should Be" (featuring Sam Frank) (2011)
 "Exothermic Reaction" / "Future Funkizm" (2011)
 "Anticipate" (featuring Sam Frank) (2011) – UK: #74
 "Gritty" / "Phatty Drummer" (2011)
 "Kingpin" (with Friction) (featuring Scrufizzer, P Money & Riko Dan) (2013)
 "Diam" / "Mood To Funk" (2013)
 "Rollercoaster" (featuring Sam Frank) (2013)
 "Sticky" (2013)
 "Kreepin" (2013)
 "Bang That" (2014)
 "Still Lemonade" (2015)
 "Room 959" (with Jonjo) (2016)
 "You Know, Right!?" (2016)
 "Old Yella" (with Dennis Ferrer) (2018)
 "Poison" (2018)
 "Ain't It Cold" (2018)
 "This Is It" (with Melody's Enemy) (2019)
 "Otto's Chant" (with Michael Bibi) (2019)
 "Song For Olivia" (2019)
 "Pussy Pop" (2019)
 "Ectogazm" (2019)
 "DUNNN" (2020)
 "EMF" (with Tom Demac) (2020)
 "LOL OK" (with Must Die! and Akeos) (2021)
 "So Sorry" (with Rudimental) (2021)

Compilations

 Various Artists – Rinse 02 (Mixed by Skream) (2007)
 Various Artists – Watch the Ride (Mixed by Skream) (2008)

Freebies

 Freeizm Vol. 1 (2010)
 Freeizm Vol. 2 (2010)
 Freeizm Vol. 3 (2010)
 The Freeizm Album (2010)
  Freeizm History  (2011)
  100K Freeizm  (2012)

Production credits

Remixes

With Magnetic Man

Albums

 Magnetic Man (2010)

EPs

 The Cyberman EP (2009)

Singles

 "I Need Air" featuring Angela Hunte (2010)
 "Perfect Stranger" featuring Katy B (2010)
 "Getting Nowhere" featuring John Legend (2011)
 "Anthemic" featuring P Money (2011)

References

Discographies of British artists
Electronic music discographies